The 2016 New York Red Bulls season was the club's twenty first season in Major League Soccer, the top division of soccer in the United States.

Team information

Squad information

Appearances and goals are career totals from all-competitions.

Roster transactions

In

Out

Draft picks

Preseason and Friendlies

Scrimmages

Friendlies

Statistics
6 Goals
 Bradley Wright-Phillips

3 Goals

 Sacha Kljestan
 Gonzalo Verón

2 Goals

 Anatole Abang
 Brandon Allen

1 Goal

 Gideon Baah
 Sean Davis
 Kemar Lawrence
 Shaun Wright-Phillips
 Vincent Bezecourt
 Mike Grella
 Dan Metzger
 Ronald Zubar
 Stefano Bonomo
 Connor Lade
 Manolo Sanchez

Major League Soccer season

Eastern Conference

Overall

Results summary

Matches

MLS Cup Playoffs

Conference semifinals

U.S. Open Cup

New York Red Bulls entered the 2016 U.S. Open Cup with the rest of Major League Soccer in the fourth round.

CONCACAF Champions League

Group stage

Player statistics
 

|-
! colspan="14" style="background:#dcdcdc; text-align:center"| Goalkeepers

|-
! colspan="14" style="background:#dcdcdc; text-align:center"| Defenders

|-
! colspan="14" style="background:#dcdcdc; text-align:center"| Midfielders

|-
! colspan="14" style="background:#dcdcdc; text-align:center"| Forwards

|-
! colspan="14" style="background:#dcdcdc; text-align:center"| Transferred During Season

|-
! colspan="14" style="background:#dcdcdc; text-align:center"| Loaned During Season

Top scorers

As of 6 November 2016.

Assist Leaders

As of 6 November 2016.
This table does not include secondary assists.

Clean sheets

As of 6 November 2016.

References

New York Red Bulls
New York Red Bulls
New York Red Bulls
New York Red Bulls seasons